The A73 is a former trunk route in Scotland, that connects the M74 at Abington, Jct. 13 to the M80 motorway at Cumbernauld. Formerly a main route connecting the north of Scotland to England it has less importance these days, and is now merely a local feeder to the two motorways with which it connects.

The sections between Abington & Carluke and Cumbernauld & Newhouse were the first sections to be downgraded from a trunk route to a secondary route, following the construction of the shorter M73 further west, which connected the M74 at Jct. 4. This motorway removed the need for vehicles from the north to use the A73 to reach England.

Following this downgrading, the remaining section of A73 between Carluke and Newhouse remained a trunk route for vehicles travelling between Glasgow and Peebles. For this reason, two new sections of dual carriageway were built between Bellside & Newmains and Bogside & Law, as well as a new bypass for the town centre of Carluke, where the trunk route continues as the A721.

Eventually though, the M74 was completed and it became easier for vehicles travelling from Peebles to Glasgow, to use the A702 trunk route instead, which also joins the M74 at Abington.

For this reason, the entire length of the A73 was downgraded to a secondary route, although it is still heavily trafficked, especially between Lanark and the M8 at Newhouse.

External links

Roads in Scotland
Transport in North Lanarkshire
Transport in South Lanarkshire
Airdrie, North Lanarkshire
Cumbernauld
Carluke
Lanark
Clydesdale